The Voltigeur class was a pair of destroyers built for the French Navy in the first decade of the 20th century. Both ships survived the First World War and were scrapped afterwards.

Design and description
The Voltigeur class was based on the preceding , albeit with a different arrangement of propulsion machinery. Designed to displaced , the ships displaced  at deep load.

The destroyers were powered by one triple-expansion steam engines and two direct-drive steam turbine. The steam engines drove the center propeller shaft while the turbine powered the two outer shafts, all using steam provided by four water-tube boilers of two different types.

The primary armament of the Voltigeur-class ships consisted of six  Modèle 1902 guns in single mounts, one each fore and aft of the superstructure and the others were distributed amidships. They were also fitted with three  torpedo tubes. One of these was in a fixed mount in the bow and the other two were on single rotating mounts amidships.

Ships
  - built by Ateliers et Chantiers de Bretagne, Nantes, launched 23 March 1909, decommissioned May 1920.
  - built by Forges et Chantiers de la Gironde, Bordeaux, launched 27 November 1908, decommissioned July 1921.

Citations

Bibliography

 
 

 
Destroyer classes
Destroyers of the French Navy
 
Ship classes of the French Navy